Isaac Makwala (born 24 September 1985) is a Botswana sprinter who specializes in the 400 metres.

Career 
He was the gold medallist at the Commonwealth Games in 2018. He has also won continental titles at the distance, winning at the 2015 African Games and twice at the African Championships in Athletics (2012, 2014). He has represented his country Botswana at the 2016 Summer Olympics, three times at the Commonwealth Games, and five times at the World Championships in Athletics (2007, 2009, 2013, 2015, 2017). With the Botswana 4 × 400 metres relay team he has won the bronze medal at the 2020 Tokyo Olympics, a silver medal at the 2017 IAAF World Relays and medals at the African Games and Championships.

His personal best time of 43.72, set 5 July 2015 in La Chaux-de-Fonds was an African continental record and ranks him number 8 on the all-time list, the second fastest non-American.  He is also a sub-20 200 metres runner.

On July 14, 2017, Isaac Makwala became the first man in history to run a 200 m within 20 seconds and a 400 m within 44 seconds on the same day by running 43.92 in the 400, then 19.77 (+0.0) in the 200, 2 hours and 20 minutes later at the Meeting de Atletismo Madrid.

He qualified for 400m final at the 2017 World Championships, before being withdrawn from the race, due to illness. He then qualified for the 200 m final, placing overall sixth.

He competed in the 400m at the 2020 Summer Olympics, finishing 7th in the final.

Major competitions record

1Did not start in the final

Personal bests
200 metres - 19.77 secs, Madrid, Spain, 14 July 2017
400 metres - 43.72 secs (#2 African all time), La Chaux-de-Fonds, Switzerland, 5 July 2015

References

External links
 
 
 

1986 births
Living people
People from Central District (Botswana)
Botswana male sprinters
Olympic athletes of Botswana
Athletes (track and field) at the 2012 Summer Olympics
Athletes (track and field) at the 2016 Summer Olympics
Athletes (track and field) at the 2020 Summer Olympics
African Games gold medalists for Botswana
African Games medalists in athletics (track and field)
Athletes (track and field) at the 2007 All-Africa Games
Athletes (track and field) at the 2015 African Games
Athletes (track and field) at the 2019 African Games
Commonwealth Games gold medallists for Botswana
Commonwealth Games medallists in athletics
Athletes (track and field) at the 2010 Commonwealth Games
Athletes (track and field) at the 2014 Commonwealth Games
Athletes (track and field) at the 2018 Commonwealth Games
World Athletics Championships athletes for Botswana
Diamond League winners
IAAF Continental Cup winners
Commonwealth Games gold medallists in athletics
Medalists at the 2020 Summer Olympics
Olympic bronze medalists in athletics (track and field)
Olympic bronze medalists for Botswana
Medallists at the 2018 Commonwealth Games